The 2017 Red Bull Air Race of Indianapolis was the eighth round of the 2017 Red Bull Air Race World Championship, the twelfth season of the Red Bull Air Race World Championship. 
The event was held at the Indianapolis Motor Speedway, in Indianapolis, the United States.

Master Class

Qualification

Round of 14

  +0:02
  +0:03
  +0:07

Round of 8

  +0:03
  +0:05

Final 4

Final result

Challenger Class

Qualification 

The final game was canceled due to bad weather.
The players were given half the usual points according to the preliminary ranking.

Standings after the event

Master Class standings

Challenger Class standings

References

External links
 Indianapolis Red Bull Air Race

|- style="text-align:center"
|width="35%"|Previous race:2017 Red Bull Air Race of Lausitz
|width="30%"|Red Bull Air Race2017 season
|width="35%"|Next race:2018 Red Bull Air Race of Abu Dhabi
|- style="text-align:center"
|width="35%"|Previous race:2016 Red Bull Air Race of Indianapolis
|width="30%"|Red Bull Air Race of Indianapolis
|width="35%"|Next race:2018 Red Bull Air Race of Indianapolis
|- style="text-align:center"

Indianapolis
Motorsport in Indianapolis
2017 in American motorsport
October 2017 sports events in the United States